Jerome Richard Berg (December 27, 1926 – January 14, 2011) was an American football coach. He served as the head football coach at Mayville State College—now known as Mayville State University—in Mayville, North Dakota, from 1956 to 1966, compiling a record of 62–20–2.

Berg was born on December 27, 1926, in Newburgh Township in Steele County, North Dakota. He attended Hatton High School in Hatton, North Dakota, before serving the United States Army toward the end of World War II. He lettered in football, basketball, baseball, and track at Mayville State before graduating in 1951.

Berg coached high school sports in Finley, North Dakota, and at Fertile High School in Fertile, Minnesota. He was the athletic director, head basketball coach and assistant football coach at Fertile for three years before he was appointed head coach in football and track at Mayville in June 1956. Berg resigned from his post at Mayville State following the 1966 football season and took a job with the Goose River Bank in Mayville.

Berg died on January 14, 2011, at Luther Memorial Home in Mayville.

Head coaching record

College

References

1926 births
2011 deaths
Mayville State Comets baseball players
Mayville State Comets football coaches
Mayville State Comets football players
Mayville State Comets men's basketball coaches
Mayville State Comets men's basketball players
College track and field coaches in the United States
College men's track and field athletes in the United States
High school basketball coaches in Minnesota
High school football coaches in Minnesota
High school football coaches in North Dakota
United States Army personnel of World War II
People from Steele County, North Dakota
Coaches of American football from North Dakota
Players of American football from North Dakota
Baseball players from North Dakota
Basketball coaches from North Dakota
Basketball players from North Dakota
Track and field athletes from North Dakota